The Monocoupe 110 Special was a United States sporting and racing aircraft of the 1930s and 1940s.

Development

The Monocoupe 110 was developed from the Monocoupe 90 using the higher-powered 110 h.p. Warner Scarab radial engine housed in a cowling with bulges to accommodate the larger power unit.

The Monocoupe 110 Special variant of 1931 was built to meet the needs of racing pilots.  The wingspan was shortened from the standard 32 ft to 23 ft, a 125 h.p. Warner Scarab was installed and fairings and wheel spats added.  Maximum speed increased from 150 mph to 220 mph. Seven of the Specials were built by Monocoupe and three further aircraft were modified to a similar standard by homebuilders.

The last Model 110 Special to be completed in 1941 was N36Y "Little Butch", which re-entered the airshow circuit in 1946, powered by a 185 h.p. Warner Super Scarab engine. The aircraft flew displays until 1981 and was then donated to the National Air and Space Museum in Washington DC.

The Monocoupe 110 Special is being reintroduced and being built in Grantville, Pennsylvania, by the Monocoupe Aeroplane Corporation.

Specifications (Monocoupe 110 Special)

References

Notes

Bibliography

External links

 Specifications and history at Aerofiles
 History at Virginia Aviation Museum

1930s United States civil utility aircraft
Racing aircraft
Aerobatic aircraft
High-wing aircraft
Aircraft first flown in 1931
Monocoupe utility aircraft